The North American Nations Cup and NAFC Championship were association football tournaments for teams in the area of North America.

In 1947 and 1949, the NAFC Championship was organized by the North American Football Confederation. Cuba, Mexico, and the United States participated in both editions of the tournament. NAFC merged with the CCCF to form CONCACAF in 1961.

After a 41-year absence, another North American championship was organized by the North American Football Union. The North American Nations Cup was contested in 1990 and 1991 by Canada, Mexico, and the United States before the introduction of the CONCACAF Gold Cup.

Results

Titles by team

Statistics

Hat-tricks
A hat-trick is achieved when the same player scores three or more goals in one match. Listed in chronological order.

See also
 CCCF Championship, held from 1941 to 1961

References 

 Karel Stokkermans: CCCF and Concacaf Championships, Rec.Sport.Soccer Statistics Foundation, 2 September 2009.
 http://www.world-results.net
 http://us.geocities.com/clasglenning/GOLDCUP.html

 
Defunct international association football competitions in North America
Recurring sporting events established in 1947
Recurring events disestablished in 1949
Recurring sporting events established in 1990
Recurring events disestablished in 1991
1947 establishments in North America
1949 disestablishments in North America
1990 establishments in North America
1991 disestablishments in North America